A royal guard is a group of military bodyguards, soldiers or armed retainers responsible for the protection of a royal person, such as the emperor or empress,  king or queen, or prince or princess. They often are an elite unit of the regular armed forces, or are designated as such, and may maintain special rights or privileges.

Institution and tasks

Royal guards have historically comprised both purely ceremonial units serving in close proximity to the monarch, as well as regiments from all arms, forming a designated substantial elite and intended for active service as part of the army. An example of the first category would include the Tropas de la Casa Real of the Spanish monarchy prior to 1930, comprising halberderos and a mounted escort. Examples of the second would include the Imperial Guards of the Russian and German Empires prior to 1917–18.

Monarchs frequently modeled their royal guards upon those of fellow rulers. Thus, Napoleon I's Garde Imperiale was imitated by his opponent Alexander I of Russia, his Bourbon successor Louis XVIII, and his nephew Napoleon III. The modern Garderegiment Grenadiers en Jagers regiment of the Netherlands and the Escorte Royale of Belgium retain features of uniform and other distinctions that can be traced back to Napoleonic influences.

Political importance
Because of their location, status, role and nature, royal guards have frequently been able to play a political role beyond their intended military and social ones. In times of revolution, the continued loyalty or defection of such units has often played a key part in the outcome of wider unrest. Historical examples were England in 1688, Spain in 1808, Sweden in 1809, France in 1789 and again in 1814-15, Russia in 1917 and Persia in 1906 and again in 1953.

List of royal guards

Past

 Mesedi, in the Hittite Empire
 Medjay, since the old kingdom of Egypt until the Ptolemaic dynasty
 Somatophylakes, in the ancient Kingdom of Macedonia
 Imperial Guard, in the Achaemenid Empire of Persia
 Javidan Guard, in the Imperial State of Iran of Persia
 Praetorian Guard, in the Roman Empire
 Jovians and Herculians, in late Roman Empire and early Byzantine Empire
 Jìn Jūn, in the Tang Dynasty of China 
 Shìwèi, in the Qing Dynasty of China
 Manchukuo Imperial Guards, in Manchukuo
 Royal Palace Guards, in Burma
 Hangu Beykalun, the Imperial Bodyguards of Maldivian Sultan, the unit was formed by Muhammad Thakurufaanu al-Auzam (1573-1585), decommissioned in early 1930s, at the end of the reign Sultan Muhammad Shamsuddeen III 
 Excubitors, Spatharii, Hetaireia, Paramonai and the Varangian Guard, in the Byzantine Empire
 Royal Foreign Units Guards, King's Royal Guards such as the Scottish Guard, Swiss Guards such as the Hundred Swiss, Guards of the French Royal Army, which served the European monarchies such as the Kingdom of France (the Ancien Régime), part of the Maison militaire du roi de France. 
 Monaspa, in the Kingdom of Georgia
 Tobang, in the Goryeo Dynasty of Korea
 Naegeumwi, in the Joseon Dynasty of Korea
 ValaShahis, in Mughal Empire
 Kheshig, in the Mongol Empire
 Athapattuva, in the Kingdom of Kandy
 Monteros de Espinosa, in the Kingdom & Crown of Castille, now part of the Guardia Real of Spain
 Walloon Guards, in Spain; recruited from the Spanish Netherlands
 Spanish Guards (Gardes Espagnoles), an infantry regiment brigaded with the Walloon Guards but recruited within Spain itself. 
 Maison militaire du roi de France (to which belonged the Garde du Corps, the Swiss Guards, and the French Guards), in the Kingdom of France
 Leyb-gvardiya, in the Russian Empire
 Imperial Guard, in Napoleon I's First French Empire
 Imperial Guard, in Napoleon III's Second French Empire
 Royal Foot Guard, in the Kingdom of Poland and the Polish–Lithuanian Commonwealth
 Leibgarde der Hartschier, in the Kingdom of Bavaria
 Guards Corps, in the Kingdom of Prussia, and later in the German Empire
 Noble Guard and Palatine Guard, in the Holy See until 1970
 Corazzieri and Granatieri di Sardegna, in the Kingdom of Sardinia and later the Kingdom of Italy
 Personal Cavalry Convoy, in the Principality of Bulgaria and Kingdom of Bulgaria
 Arcièren-Leibgarde (Lifeguard of Halberdiers), in the Austro-Hungarian Empire 1700-1918
 Trabanten Leibgarde (Gentlemen at Arms), in the Austro-Hungarian Empire until 1918
 Hofburgwache (Palace Bodyguard) in the Austrian Empire. Became the Leibgarde-Infantrerie-Kompanie (Guard Infantry Company) in 1802. 
 Leibgarde-Reiter-Eskedron (Bodyguard Mounted Squadron) in the Austro-Hungarian Empire until 1918.
 Konigliche Ungarische adelige Leibgarde (Royal Hungarian Noble Bodyguard) 
 Royal Hungarian Crown Guard. In existence under both the Austro-Hungarian Empire and the subsequent Kingdom of Hungary 
 Royal Guard of the Halberdiers, in the Kingdom of Portugal
 Imperial Guard of the Halberdiers, in the Empire of Brazil
 Royal Palace Guard, in Belgium
 Royal Guard in Greece, now the Presidential Guard
 Romanian Royal Guards, in Romania
Konoe Shidan (近衛師団), in Japan

Present
 Royal Guard, in Bahrain
 Royal Escort, in Belgium
 Den Kongelige Livgarde and Guard Hussar Regiment Mounted Squadron, in Denmark
Imperial Guard of the National Police Agency, in Japan
Royal Johor Military Force, in Malaysia
 Compagnie des Carabiniers du Prince, in Monaco
 Royal Guard, in Morocco
 Pontifical Swiss Guard, in Vatican City
 Grenadiers' and Rifles Guard Regiment, Garderegiment Fuseliers Prinses Irene and the Royal Marechaussee in the Netherlands
 Hans Majestet Kongens Garde, in Norway
 Royal Guard, in Oman
Royal Guard Regiment, in Saudi Arabia
 Guardia Real, in Spain
 Livgardet and Livregementets husarer, in Sweden
 King's Guard and the Royal Security Command, in Thailand
 King's Guard; Royal Company of Archers; and Yeomen of the Guard, in the United Kingdom

Similar units 
 Foot guards
 Household Division
 Imperial guard
 Lifeguard
 Presidential guard

Related units 
 Colour guard
 Guard of honour
 Sovereign's Bodyguard

See also 
 United States Secret Service
 Republican guard
 National guard
 Swiss Guards

References

External links 
 

Military organization
Lists of military units and formations
 
Protective security units
 
Bodyguards